Heimat is a German word with no English equivalent that denotes the relationship of a human being towards a certain spatial social unit.

Heimat may also refer to:

Heimat (play), an 1893 play by Hermann Sudermann
Heimat (1938 film), by Carl Froelich, based on the play
Heimat (film series), by Edgar Reitz
Heimat (1984 film), the first film in the series
Heimat (schooner)

See also
Heimatfilm, a genre of German-language cinema